Dan Daniels may refer to:

 Dan Daniels (sportscaster) (1922–2012), American sportscaster 
 Dan Daniels (politician) (1908–1991), Canadian politician
 Danny Daniels (1924–2017), American choreographer

See also  
 Dan Daniel (disambiguation)
 Daniel Danielis (1635–1696), Belgian composer